Stigmella populnea is a moth of the family Nepticulidae. It is only known from Hokkaido in Japan.

The larvae feed on Populus nigra. They mine the leaves of their host plant.

References

External links
Japanese Species Of The Genus Stigmella (Nepticulidae: Lepidoptera)

Nepticulidae
Moths of Japan
Moths described in 1985